Mariángel Villasmil Arteaga (born 22 April 1996) is a Venezuelan actress, model and beauty pageant titleholder who was crowned Miss Venezuela 2020. She represented the state of Zulia at the pageant and represent Venezuela at the Miss Universe 2020 competition.

Life and career

Early life 
Villasmil was born in Ciudad Ojeda, Zulia. She is a psychology student at Arturo Michelena University in Valencia. Villasmil began her career in the world of beauty in regional competitions for the state of Zulia and as a model in small agencies in Ciudad Ojeda. In 2018 she also participated in the Venezuelan reality show El Contest ('El Concurso': in spanish) By Osmel Sousa where she advance into the semifinalists of the western region or Zulia region.

Education 
She is also a writer and a professional pastry chef, owner of her own pastry shop in Maracaibo, called Sláinte Cakes. Before winning Miss Venezuela, Villasmil was in her fourth semester studying psychology at the Arturo Michelena University in Valencia, Carabobo. She speaks both English and her native Spanish. She is also a model and a writer.

Pageantry

Miss Venezuela 2020 
At the end of Miss Venezuela 2020 held on September 24, 2020, Villasmil was crowned Miss Venezuela 2020. She will represent Venezuela in Miss Universe 2020. Villasmil succeeded Miss Venezuela 2019, Thalía Olvino and was crowned by her at the final event. Her court included Miss Venezuela World 2020, Alejandra Conde from Aragua and Miss Venezuela International 2020, Isbel Parra from Región Guayana. Since her crowning, Villasmil has attended many events with her fellow Miss Venezuela and Mister Venezuela titleholders. She has advocated for her "Love Yourself" campaign, which tries to promote self-love and self-knowledge in people.

Miss Universe 2020 
In May 2021, she represented Venezuela at the Miss Universe 2020 pageant hosted in Hollywood, Florida, United States. For her national costume, she chose to represent the known Catatumbo lightning, an atmospheric phenomenon that occurs over the mouth of the Catatumbo River where it empties into Lake Maracaibo in Venezuela. On the night of the pageant, she did not place in the Top 21 and thus became the 23rd Miss Venezuela to not place in the semifinals. Other recent candidates that did not place in the semifinals are Ana Karina Añez in 2004, Jictzad Viña in 2006, Marelisa Gibson in 2010 and Mariam Habach in 2016. Mariángel Villasmil is the first Miss Venezuela not to place following the retirement of longtime pageant director Osmel Sousa and the first under new national director Gabriela Isler.

References

External links
 

Living people
1996 births
Venezuelan beauty pageant winners
Venezuelan female models
Venezuelan actresses
People from Ciudad Ojeda
Miss Universe 2020 contestants
Miss Venezuela winners
Venezuelan Roman Catholics